American singer-songwriter Justin Timberlake has written and recorded material for his five studio albums. Timberlake released his solo debut studio album, Justified, in November 2002. Most of the album was produced by The Neptunes, with additional collaborators including Brian McKnight, Scott Storch, Timbaland, and The Underdogs. "Like I Love You", written by Timberlake, Chad Hugo and Pharrell Williams. "Cry Me a River", produced by Timbaland, is a R&B song about a brokenhearted man who moves on from his past. A Rolling Stone reviewer called the song a "breakup aria." Timberlake, Hugo and Williams also wrote "Rock Your Body" and "Señorita".

His second studio album FutureSex/LoveSounds, was released in September 2006. It infuses R&B and pop with techno, funk, and elements of rock, the last being the genre that was the main inspiration of Timberlake during the album's recording. The electro R&B song  "SexyBack", is built around a pounding bass beat, electronic chords, and beat box sounds. Andrew Murfett of The Age wrote that the song was a "raunchy club banger that slyly suppresses" Timberlake's customary falsetto. "My Love" is a synthpop-influenced, R&B and hip hop song. "What Goes Around... Comes Around", is a pop-R&B song performed in a slow manner and was described by some music critics as a "sequel" to his 2002 song "Cry Me a River". "LoveStoned/I Think She Knows" is an R&B and art rock song that contains sexually suggestive lyrics and includes "human beatbox sounds" in its composition. Rolling Stone described the song as "flowing from hip-hop bump-and-grind to an ambient wash of Interpol-inspired guitar drone." Timberlake co-wrote and appeared as a featured vocalist on several songs, including "Give It to Me" with Timbaland, "Ayo Technology" with 50 Cent, "4 Minutes" with Madonna and "Dead and Gone" with T.I.

In March 2013, after a seven-year hiatus from his solo music career, Timberlake released his third studio album, The 20/20 Experience. The record incorporates neo soul styles with elements of older rock and soul music; its lyrics discuss themes of romance and sex. As a songwriter, Timberlake mainly collaborated with Timbaland, Jerome "J-Roc" Harmon and James Fauntleroy, and co-produced the tracks along with Timbaland and Harmon. "Suit & Tie", is a mid-tempo R&B song, that incorporates a "slow-drawl"  consisting of slowed down synths and "slightly out of time" drum claps, similar to the Chopped and Screwed. "Mirrors", is a progressive pop and R&B track, lyrically a love song about person's other half. "Let the Groove Get In" is a dance and pop song accompanied by canned horns, propulsive percussion and Timberlake's harmonized voice over a pop arrangement. In September 2013, Timberlake released the second half of the project, The 20/20 Experience – 2 of 2. It included the pop ballad "Not a Bad Thing" and the  gospel-blues "Drink You Away". Timberlake also appeared on the songs "Love Never Felt So Good" from Xscape and "Holy Grail" from Magna Carta Holy Grail. For the disco-pop song "Can't Stop the Feeling!", Timberlake collaborated in the songwriting and production with Max Martin and Shellback. The production of his fifth studio album Man of the Woods (2018) was handled by Timberlake, The Neptunes, Timbaland, Danja, and Rob Knox.

This list shows the title, year, other performers, and writers for each song which Timberlake has recorded during his solo career, outside the band NSYNC.

Released songs

Unreleased songs

See also 
Justin Timberlake discography
NSYNC discography

Notes

References 

 
Timberlake, Justin